Abbotsbury Castle is an Iron Age hill fort in south west Dorset, England, situated on Wears Hill above the village of Abbotsbury, seven miles west of Dorchester and the famous hill fort at Maiden Castle.

It is situated on a high chalk hill overlooking the English Channel, and in its day was the front line of defence from invasion.

The fort was occupied by the Celtic Durotriges tribe, but when the Romans invaded in AD 43, the second Augustian legion of Vespasian took the fort quickly with little struggle before moving on to Maiden Castle.  There is no evidence that the Romans settled at Abbotsbury Castle as they did at some other hill forts.

References

External links

 Abbotsbury history

Hill forts in Dorset
History of Dorset
Sites of Special Scientific Interest in Dorset